The 1964 Campeonato Paulista de Futebol da Divisão Especial de Profissionais, organized by the Federação Paulista de Futebol, was the 63rd season of São Paulo's top professional football league. Santos won the title for the 8th time. Esportiva de Guaratinguetá was relegated and the top scorer was Santos's Pelé with 34 goals.

Championship
The championship was disputed in a double-round robin system, with the team with the most points winning the title and the team with the fewest points being relegated.

Top Scores

References

Campeonato Paulista seasons
Paulista